The 1995 Queen's Birthday Honours in New Zealand, celebrating the official birthday of Elizabeth II, were appointments made by the Queen in her right as Queen of New Zealand, on the advice of the New Zealand government, to various orders and honours to reward and highlight good works by New Zealanders. They were announced on 17 June 1995.

The recipients of honours are displayed here as they were styled before their new honour.

Order of New Zealand (ONZ)
Ordinary member
 Sir Roy Allan McKenzie  – of Eastbourne.
 Dame Kiri Janette Te Kanawa   – of Surrey, United Kingdom.
 Sir (Frederick) Miles Warren  – of Governors Bay.

Knight Bachelor
 Patrick Ledger Goodman  – of Motueka. For services to business management, export and the community.
 Dr Thomas Neil Morris Waters – of Palmerston North. For services to tertiary education.

Order of the Bath

Companion (CB)
Civil division
 Dr Graham Cecil Scott – of Wellington. For public services.

Order of Saint Michael and Saint George

Companion (CMG)
 Lieutenant General Donald Stuart McIver  – New Zealand Army (Retired), of Lower Hutt; director, New Zealand Security Intelligence Service.

Order of the British Empire

Dame Commander (DBE)
Civil division
 Pauline Frances Engel (Sister Pauline Engel)  – of Auckland. For services to education.

Knight Commander (KBE)
Civil division
 Peter James Blake  – of Emsworth, Hampshire, United Kingdom. For services to yachting.

Commander (CBE)
Civil division
 Dianne Jean Armstrong – of Wellington. For services to the Royal New Zealand Plunket Society.
 Russell Coutts  – of Auckland. For services to yachting.
 Morva Olwyn Croxson – of Palmerston North. For services to arts and the community.
 Albert Barrie Downey – of Auckland. For services to business and the community.
 Graeme James Marsh – of Dunedin. For services to export and the community.
 Alexander Phillips  – of Taumarunui. For services to the Māori people.
 Mark James Todd  – of Moreton-in-Marsh, United Kingdom. For services to equestrian sport.
 Beatrice Dorothy Anne Town  – of Wellington. For services to the community.
 John Joseph Turei  – of Auckland. For services to the Māori people.
 David Houghton Wale – of Wellington. For services to business management and the community.
 Heather Jean White  – of Te Puke. For services to the community.

Officer (OBE)
Civil division
 Donald Hall Binney – of Auckland. For services to art.
 John Kenneth Buck – of Havelock North. For services to the wine industry.
 James Bull – of Hunterville. For services to racing and farming.
 Bradley William Butterworth – of Auckland. For services to yachting.
 Leslie Hambleton Cleveland – of Dunedin. For services to the community.
 Michael Ernest Christopher Cox – of Wellington. For public services.
 Alister Austen Deans – of Geraldine. For services to art.
 Joan Marjore Dingley – of Auckland. For services to botany.
 Dr Alan Robert Edmunds – of Christchurch. For services to the wool industry.
 Dr Wayne Leonard Edwards – of Palmerston North. For services to education and intercultural programmes.
 William Clive Edwards – of Auckland. For services to the community.
 John Noel Keegan – of Auckland. For services to business management and the community.
 Dr Hylton LeGrice – of Auckland. For service to the community.
 David Raymond Levene – of Auckland. For services to business and the community.
 Professor Robert Park – of Christchurch. For services to civil engineering.
 Suzanne Lena Prentice – of Invercargill. For services to music.
 Thomas William Schnackenberg  – of Auckland. For services to yachting.
 Robin Scholes – of Auckland. For services to the film industry.

Military division
 Commander Larry Robbins – Royal New Zealand Navy.

Member (MBE)
Civil division
 Marie Rose Aubin – of Dunedin. For services to education and the community.
 Marilyn Ann Baikie – of Christchurch. For services to the disabled.
 Tuakana Charlie Carlson – of Wellington. For services to the community.
 Susan Winifred Jane Dean Chatfield – of Auckland. For services to the community.
 Patricia Maldwyn Clapham  – of Orewa. For services to the community.
 Caryll Lydia Mary Clausen  – of Feilding. For services to local-body and community affairs.  
 Owen Francis Delany – of Taupō. For services to sport.  
 Sandra Helen Edge – of Auckland. For services to netball.
 Dr Bernard John Forde  – of Palmerston North. For services to local-body and community affairs.  
 Maureen Clara Fox – of Invercargill. For services to education.
 Colin Heber Gordge  – of Morrinsville. For services to farming.
 Robert Morris Jarrett – of Pukekohe. For services to bowls.
 Peter Robert Knight – of Christchurch. For services to powerboat sport.
 Richard Trevor Vincent Linnell – of Kaiwaka. For services to the community.
 Raymond William Lynskey – of Blenheim. For services to gliding.
 Patricia Mary McQuillan – of Auckland. For services to the community.
 Arthur Dawson Moir  – of Roxburgh. For services to the community.
 Dr Peter Charles Molan – of Hamilton. For services to the honey industry.
 Peter John Montgomery – of Auckland. For services to sports broadcasting.
 Alan Joseph O'Connell – of Queenstown. For services to sport and the community.
 George Emile Rennie – of Leeston. For services to farming.
 Alon Edgar Shaw – of Warkworth. For services to education. 
 Eileen Margaret Skidmore – of Te Aroha. For services to the community. 
 Raymond Terence Whatmough – superintendent, New Zealand Police.

Military division
 Major Nigel John Murray – Royal New Zealand Army Medical Corps.
 Squadron Leader Kenneth Albert James Cunningham – Royal New Zealand Air Force.
 Squadron Leader Graeme Warren Harris – Royal New Zealand Air Force (Retired).

British Empire Medal (BEM)
Military division
 Warrant Officer Class Two Ross Charles Fearon – Royal New Zealand Army Ordnance Corps.
 Sergeant Darryl Brian Lark – Corps of Royal New Zealand Engineers.
 Flight Sergeant Calvin Paul Clare – Royal New Zealand Air Force (Retired).
 Flight Sergeant Ronald Gregory Cox – Royal New Zealand Air Force.

Companion of the Queen's Service Order (QSO)

For community service
 Elizabeth Desiree Ferguson Baxendine – of Christchurch.
 The Reverend John Ernest Bowles – of Lower Hutt.
 Colin Arthur Gilmour-Wilson  – of Taupō.
 Audrey Gwen Harris – of Te Kauwhata.
 The Reverend Kenneth Gerard Irwin – of Auckland.
 Archbishop Dionysios Psiachas – of Wellington.
 The Very Reverend John Oliver Rymer – of Auckland.
 Patricia Margaret Teague – of Christchurch.

For public services
 Dr Elizabeth Ursula Alley – of Wellington.
 Brian Phillip Najib Corban – of Auckland.
 Valerie Madeline Lawson (Sister Valerie) – of Lower Hutt.
 Angus John Macdonald  – of Ngāruawāhia.  
 Colin James McKenzie – of Wellington; lately Secretary of Labour.
 Margaret Moir  – of Hokitika.
 Gladys Joyce Ryan – of Whangārei.
 David Ernest Walter  – of Stratford.

Queen's Service Medal (QSM)

For community service
 Sarah Teira Priscilla Ashby  – of Te Kūiti.
 Patricia Irene Ball – of Hamilton.
 Robert Anthony Leighton Batley – of Taihape.
 June Emily Bonnington – of Timaru.
 Owen Mervyn Brookes  – of Huntly.
 Doreen Elizabeth Burns – of Waiheke Island.
 Hilda Ngahiraka Rangi Busby – of Tikipunga.
 Alice Elizabeth Calder – of Levin.
 Amie Euphemia Isobel Calvert – of Waikanae.
 Rosemary Bridget Chapman – of Christchurch.
 Claire Mary Emberson  – of Auckland.
 Esther May Hepburn – of Ashburton.
 Wiremu Hapi Hunia – of Kawerau.
 Joan Gertrude Johnson – of Wellington.
 Lorna Monica Leydon – of Lower Hutt.
 Locksley Clement Lindsay – of The Pines Beach.
 Joan-Mary Longcroft  – of Auckland.
 Bryan Mahony – of Wellington.
 Norman John Martin – of Hastings.
 Noel Albert McMahon – of Auckland.
 William James McMullan – of Wellington.
 Frederick Lewis Mitchell – of Christchurch.
 Phillis Hilda Murphy – of Featherston.
 Clarence Roland Papps  – of Tākaka.
 Eliza Raiha Serjeant – of Maketu.
 Mavis Eileen Steffens – of Motueka.
 Ellen Adrienne, Lady Stewart – of Christchurch.
 Alan George Tozer – of New Plymouth.
 Charles Iotua Tuarau – of Lower Hutt.
 Esther Taylor Turner – of Kerikeri.
 Dorothy Ethel Walker – of Auckland.
 Ellen Mary (Ella) Warren – of Dargaville.
 Carolyn Georgina Weston – of Invercargill.
 Joan Elizabeth Williams – of Auckland.
 Lesley Iris Wills – of Matamata.
 Eunice Boyce Wilson – of Pukekohe.

For public services
 Charles George Anderson – of Wanganui.
 Evelyn Annette Carrington – of Whangārei.
 Clive Basil Cleland – of Hamilton.
 Helen Dashfield – of Masterton.
 William James Davey – sergeant, New Zealand Police.
 Ian George Duncan – senior constable, New Zealand Police.
 David Peter Ellery – of Rotorua.
 Carol June Garland – of Christchurch.
 Paul Ronald Garland – of Christchurch.
 Catherine May Glynn – of Auckland.
 Malcolm Campbell Grayling – of New Plymouth.
 Ruth Jacqualine Hera Harris  – of Rangiotu.
 Marsden Alfred Heaslip – of Katikati.
 Lorraine Anne Hill – of Russell.
 Wilfred Jeffs (Bill Sevesi) – of Auckland.
 Ian Roy Johnson  – of Te Puke.
 Diana Patricia Lenihan – of Invercargill.
 William James McCabe – of Wainuiomata.
 Julie Margaret McKendry  – of Blenheim.
 Heather Margaret MacLeod – of Auckland.
 Ronald Kenneth McSkimming – of Ranfurly.
 Irene Saxon Messenger – of Greymouth.
 John Bracken Mortimer – of Hamilton.
 Margaret Mortimer – of Hamilton.
 Catherine Jean Motion – of Thames.
 Miriam Harris Murray  – of Dunedin.
 Glenys Patricia Searancke – of Rotorua.
 Helen Mary Smith  – of Porirua.
 Heather Jane Te Huia – of Porirua.
 Christina Manuhopukia Waihape  – of Tauranga.
 William Grigor Walker – of Clinton.
 Kathleen Florence Wills  – of Timaru.
 Phillippa Alix Woodward – of Blenheim.

Queen's Fire Service Medal (QFSM)
 Walter Henry Mills – lately deputy chief fire officer, Cambridge Volunteer Fire Brigade, New Zealand Fire Service. 
 Robert Alexander Morriss – chief fire officer, Te Awamutu Volunteer Fire Brigade, New Zealand Fire Service.
 Brian Muschamp – chief fire officer, Hāwera and Okaiawa Fire Brigades, New Zealand Fire Service.

Queen's Police Medal (QPM)
 John Morris Atkinson Gott – detective senior sergeant, New Zealand Police.

Air Force Cross (AFC)
 Wing Commander Peter James Stockwell – Royal New Zealand Air Force.

Queen's Commendation for Valuable Service in the Air
 Flight Lieutenant Grant Redvers Withers – Royal New Zealand Air Force.

References

Birthday Honours
1995 awards
1995 in New Zealand
New Zealand awards